The third season of the Japanese animated television series A Certain Magical Index, based on the light novel of the same name, follows Toma Kamijo and Index in their journey to stop the God's Right Seat of the Roman Catholic Church and their plans that will lead to World War III. It was produced by J.C.Staff, with Hiroshi Nishikiori and Hiroyuki Yoshino serving as director and series composition writer, respectively.

Atsushi Abe and Yuka Iguchi reprise their respective roles as Kamijo and Index. They are joined by Rina Satō, Nobuhiko Okamoto, and Satoshi Hino as the season's main cast, with the latter voicing Shiage Hamazura, who appeared in the second season's final episode. A Certain Magical Index III was announced in October 2017 as part of "A Certain Project 2018" and adapts the final nine volumes of the light novel. The third season aired in Japan from October 5, 2018, to April 5, 2019, and consists of 26 episodes.


Episode list

Cast and characters

Main

Recurring

Production

Development
Kazuma Miki, the light novel editor, apologized to fans who attended the Dengeki Bunko Autumn Festival 2015 in October for not having a sequel to A Certain Magical Index II (2010) "yet". He teased a possible third season in April 2016 and later asked fans to "wait a little longer" for its release. At the Dengeki Bunko Autumn Festival 2017 in October, Miki confirmed the production of A Certain Magical Index III as part of several projects under "A Certain Project 2018". In June 2018, J.C.Staff was confirmed to be producing the series, while Hiroshi Nishikiori and Yuichi Tanaka returned from the previous two seasons as the director and character animation designer, respectively. Hiroyuki Yoshino, who scripted A Certain Magical Index: The Movie – The Miracle of Endymion (2013), was confirmed to be the series composition writer, replacing Masanao Akahoshi. Additional staff members from A Certain Magical Index and A Certain Scientific Railgun anime series were confirmed in August 2018 to be returning for the third season.

Writing
Kazuma Kamachi, creator of Index franchise, revealed that there were initial talks to make the third sequel a reboot of the series. Miki said that the production committee decided in the end to adapt the remaining volumes for the new season since fans wanted the whole story to be completed. The third season adapted the fourteenth to the twenty-second volume of the light novel.

Casting
Atsushi Abe and Yuka Iguchi confirmed in October 2017 their return for the third season as Toma Kamijo and Index, respectively. In June 2018, Rina Satō, Nobuhiko Okamoto, and Satoshi Hino were confirmed to be returning as Mikoto Misaka, Accelerator, and Shiage Hamazura, respectively. Additional cast members were announced in September 2018, including Yoko Soumi as Elizard, Kei Shindou as Carissa, Sayaka Harada as Villian, Takehito Koyasu as the Knight Leader, and Toshiyuki Morikawa as Fiamma of the Right.

Music
Maiko Iuchi of I've Sound was confirmed in July 2018 to be returning from the previous two seasons to compose the series. Maon Kurosaki performed the first opening theme music titled "Gravitation", while Iguchi performed the first ending theme music titled , which were used from episodes 1 to 15. Kurosaki also performed the second opening theme music titled "Roar", while Iguchi also performed the second ending theme music titled , which were used from episode 16 onwards.

Marketing
A teaser trailer for A Certain Magical Index III was released at Anime Expo 2018 in July, while a promotional trailer was released at the 94th Comiket in August. The cast attended a stage event for the series at Kyoto International Manga Anime Fair 2018 in September. A commercial video was released on the series' official website in October 2018.

Release

Broadcast
A Certain Magical Index III began airing in Japan on AT-X, Tokyo MX, and BS11 on October 5, 2018, and on MBS on October 6. Muse Communication began airing the series in Taiwan on i-Fun Anime Channel on October 7, 2018.

Home media

NBCUniversal Entertainment Japan released eight Blu-ray and DVD volumes of A Certain Magical Index III starting December 26, 2018. Each volume contains a bonus novel written by Kamachi titled A Certain Scientific Railgun SS3. The first and fifth limited-edition volumes are bundled with episodes 6 and 7 of the bonus anime A Certain Magical Index-tan. A 7-disc Blu-ray box was released on September 29, 2021. Funimation released the first combo set in North America on October 1, 2019, and the second combo set on January 7, 2020.

In October 2018, Funimation announced their simulcasting and dubbing of the series, while Crunchyroll began simulcasting it outside Asia. Muse Communication started distributing the full season on their Muse Asia YouTube channel on August 21, 2019. Hulu released the series in Japan on March 24, 2022.

Reception
Theron Martin of Anime News Network graded A Certain Magical Index III 'B−', stating that it was "problematic" and being mishandled as compared to A Certain Scientific Accelerator (2019) and A Certain Scientific Railgun T (2020). He also noted its pacing and complicated story arcs but praised its delivery of "what has always made the franchise entertaining". The series received heavy criticism from fans due to its "paltry" run and "wonky pacing", prompting them to send Nishikiori their hate messages.

Notes

References

External links
 

2018 anime television series debuts
A Certain Magical Index episode lists
A Certain Magical Index
J.C.Staff